Pang Long (born May 2, 1971) is a Chinese singer. Two Butterflies and You are My Rose are his representative works.

Biography
Pang was born in Fuxin, Liaoning, China in 1971, his father is a miner, he has 3 older sisters.

After graduating from vocational high school, he worked as a worker. Pang studied music under Zhang Mu in 1994. Pang entered Shenyang Conservatory of Music in 1997.

Pang joined the Chinese People's Liberation Army Naval Song and Dance Troupe.

References

External links

1971 births
Living people
People from Fuxin
Chinese Mandopop singers
Shenyang Conservatory of Music alumni
Singers from Liaoning
21st-century Chinese male singers